Lingay is an uninhabited island in Scotland, one of ten islands in the Sound of Barra, a Site of Community Importance for conservation in the Western Isles. It lies between South Uist, Eriskay, Fuday and Fiaraidh, once anglicized as Fiaray. Its maximum height is 51 metres.

Footnotes

Islands of the Sound of Barra
Uninhabited islands of the Outer Hebrides